Canelo Álvarez vs. Sergey Kovalev was a professional boxing match between Canelo Álvarez and defending WBO light heavyweight champion Sergey Kovalev. The fight took place at the MGM Grand Garden Arena in Paradise, Nevada on November 2, 2019. Álvarez won by 11th-round knockout.

Background 

Álvarez made his debut at light heavyweight and was looking to become a three-weight world champion by challenging WBO titleholder Kovalev, who was defending his title after having fought two months prior on August 24, 2019. Kovalev was stopped for just the third time in his career when Álvarez knocked him out in the 11th round.

Fight card

Aftermath 
Immediately after the bout, many fight fans started asking Kovalev on social media about why he allegedly took a dive. The former champion answered via several videos on his Instagram page,:

Álvarez responded by calling Kovalev a "bad loser".

Broadcasting 
The fight was streamed live on DAZN in the United States and nine other countries, televised on both FTA Azteca 7 in Mexico and Channel One in Russia.

Fight purses 
According to the Nevada State Athletic Commission, Álvarez earned an official purse of $35 million and Kovalev a $3 million purse. These figures are the final figures they will earn as Canelo has a subscription deal which means no potential PPV revenue.

Guaranteed base purses

 Canelo Álvarez ($35 million) vs. Sergey Kovalev ($3 million)
 Ryan Garcia ($250,000) vs. Romero Duno ($50,000)
 Bakhram Murtazaliev ($55,000) vs. Jorge Fortea ($20,000)
 Seniesa Estrada ($50,000) vs. Marlen Esparza ($50,000)
 Blair Cobbs ($20,000) vs. Carlos Ortiz ($5,000)
 Meiirim Nursultanov ($12,500) vs. Cristian Olivas ($12,000)

Notes
1.

References

Kovalev
2019 in boxing
Golden Boy Promotions
Boxing in Las Vegas
2019 in sports in Nevada
November 2019 sports events in the United States
Events in Paradise, Nevada
DAZN